South Greeley is a census-designated place (CDP) in Laramie County, Wyoming, United States. It is part of the Cheyenne, Wyoming Metropolitan Statistical Area. The population was 4,733 at the 2020 census.  The population was 4,217 at the 2010 census.

Geography
South Greeley is located at  (41.097040, -104.805302).

According to the United States Census Bureau, the CDP has a total area of 1.7 square miles (4.4 km2), all land.

Despite its name, South Greeley lies approximately 50 miles north of Greeley, Colorado.

Demographics
At the 2020 Census, there were 4,733 people.  At the 2000 census, there were 4,201 people, 1,553 households and 1,091 families residing in the CDP. The population density was 2,489.6 per square mile (959.8/km2). There were 1,679 housing units at an average density of 995.0/sq mi (383.6/km2). The racial makeup of the CDP was 84.86% White, 2.31% African American, 1.50% Native American, 0.33% Asian, 7.19% from other races, and 3.81% from two or more races. Hispanic or Latino of any race were 14.90% of the population.

There were 1,553 households, of which 42.0% had children under the age of 18 living with them, 48.6% were married couples living together, 14.8% had a female householder with no husband present, and 29.7% were non-families. 22.5% of all households were made up of individuals, and 4.7% had someone living alone who was 65 years of age or older. The average household size was 2.71 and the average family size was 3.15.

32.1% of the population were under the age of 18, 10.9% from 18 to 24, 33.8% from 25 to 44, 17.8% from 45 to 64, and 5.3% who were 65 years of age or older. The median age was 29 years. For every 100 females, there were 103.3 males. For every 100 females age 18 and over, there were 101.2 males.

The median household income was $31,729 and the median family income was $34,015. Males had a median income of $28,468 vand females $19,696. The per capita income was $13,925. About 14.0% of families and 16.6% of the population were below the poverty line, including 23.4% of those under age 18 and 12.2% of those age 65 or over.

Education
Public education in the community of South Greeley is provided by Laramie County School District #1.

References

Census-designated places in Laramie County, Wyoming
Census-designated places in Wyoming